Dorstenia mannii is a plant species in the genus Dorstenia.

6,8-Diprenyleriodictyol, dorsmanin C and dorsmanin F can be found in D. mannii.

References

External links 

mannii
Plants described in 1871
Taxa named by Joseph Dalton Hooker